Shahid Hussain (born 29 December 1970) is a Pakistani former cricketer. He played 78 first-class and 37 List A matches for several domestic teams in Pakistan between 1986 and 1998.

See also
 List of Pakistan Automobiles Corporation cricketers

References

External links
 

1970 births
Living people
Pakistani cricketers
Islamabad cricketers
Pakistan Automobiles Corporation cricketers
Pakistan National Shipping Corporation cricketers
Peshawar cricketers
United Bank Limited cricketers
Cricketers from Peshawar